The Capital Markets and Services Act 2007, is a Malaysian laws which enacted to consolidate the Securities Industry Act 1983 [Act 280] and Futures Industry Act 1993 [Act 499], to regulate and to provide for matters relating to the activities, markets and intermediaries in the capital markets, and for matters consequential and incidental thereto.

Structure
The Capital Markets and Services Act 2007, in its current form (15 September 2015), consists of 13 Parts containing 394 sections and 11 schedules (including 4 amendments).

References

External links
 Capital Markets and Services Act 2007 

2007 in Malaysian law
Malaysian federal legislation